Patricia Anne "Pat" Pryce (née Nutting; born 4 January 1942) is a retired English hurdler.

Athletics career
She competed in the 80 metres hurdles event at the 1960 Summer Olympics in Rome, the 1964 Summer Olympics in Tokyo and the 1968 Summer Olympics in Mexico City.

She represented England in the 80 metres hurdles and long jump at the 1962 British Empire and Commonwealth Games in Perth, Western Australia. Four years later she competed in the 80 metres hurdles in the 1966 British Empire and Commonwealth Games in Kingston, Jamaica.

Pryce won eight WAAA Championships hurdles titles, winning the 80 metres hurdles three times (1963, 1964 and 1968), the 100 metres hurdles twice (1963 and 1964) and the 200 metres hurdles three times (1961, 1962 and 1963).

References

External links

 Pat Pryce-Nutting. sports-reference.com

1942 births
Living people
English female hurdlers
Olympic athletes of Great Britain
Athletes (track and field) at the 1960 Summer Olympics
Athletes (track and field) at the 1964 Summer Olympics
Athletes (track and field) at the 1968 Summer Olympics
Commonwealth Games competitors for England
Athletes (track and field) at the 1962 British Empire and Commonwealth Games
Athletes (track and field) at the 1966 British Empire and Commonwealth Games